1stdibs (stylized as 1stDibs) is an e-commerce company. It has an online marketplace, which sells luxury items such as high-end furniture for interior design, fine art and jewelry. The company has been recognized for "pushing the antiques business into the 21st century." Originally founded in Paris, it is currently headquartered in New York City.

History 
1stDibs was founded in 2000 by Michael Bruno as an online luxury marketplace for antiques after he visited the Marché aux Puces in Paris, France. 1stDibs.com started as a listings site for art dealers to sell offline, but the site was redesigned in 2013 to give buyers the option to purchase items online. The company has received praise for restricting its listings to authorized dealers for authenticity, and scrutiny for preventing dealers from completing a negotiation offline to avoid the company's commission fees.

In 2015, 1stDibs raised $50 million from venture capital firm Insight Partners. Part of that funding went to buy out Bruno's shares, who had stepped away from day-to-day operations. The raise added Deven Parekh from Insight to the company's board.

In March 2019, the company completed a Series D funding round of $76 million. It has received $170 million in funding to date and has a valuation of more than $500 million. As of February 2019, 1stDibs works with 4,000 dealers in 28 countries.

In December 2019, 1stDibs closed its brick-and-mortar location at Terminal Stores after the new owner of the building began a large-scale construction project.

In March 2021, due to increased online shopping as a results of the COVID-19 pandemic and to increased demand via social network Instagram, 1stDibs showed a 20% increase in demand for its vintage products, with some categories increasing 80%. 

In June 2021, the company went public on the Nasdaq, under the symbol DIBS.

References

External links

Internet properties established in 2000
Retail companies established in 2000
French companies established in 2000
Online marketplaces of France
2021 initial public offerings
Companies listed on the Nasdaq
Companies based in Paris
Publicly traded companies based in New York City